Inhabit means to live in, reside in, occupy or populate some place – a so-called habitat.

Inhabit may also refer to:

 Inhabit (album), an album by Living Sacrifice
 Inhabited (band), a rock group

See also
 Circumstellar habitable zone
 List of uninhabited regions
 Planetary habitability